Peter Gregory Morgan (born 29 September 1972) is a South African former first-class cricketer.

Born at Johannesburg in September 1972, Morgan was educated in England at Eton College, before going up to Keble College, Oxford. While studying at Oxford, he played first-class cricket for Oxford University in 1997, making ten appearances, including an appearance in The University Match against Cambridge University. In his ten first-class matches, he scored 444 runs at an average of 26.11 and a high score of 63.

References

External links

1972 births
Living people
People from Johannesburg
People educated at Eton College
Alumni of Keble College, Oxford
South African cricketers
Oxford University cricketers